José Rojas (born 23 June 1970) is a Spanish freestyle skier. He competed at the 1992 Winter Olympics and the 1994 Winter Olympics.

References

External links
 

1970 births
Living people
Spanish male freestyle skiers
Olympic freestyle skiers of Spain
Freestyle skiers at the 1992 Winter Olympics
Freestyle skiers at the 1994 Winter Olympics
Sportspeople from Granada